Inline figure skating is figure skating on inline figure skates—three or four-wheel frames with a toe-stop, mounted on figure skating boots in rockered configuration.

Inline figure skating began as an off-ice training alternative for ice figure skaters. The International Roller Sports Federation (FIRS) has recognized it as artistic roller skating on inline skates and includes inline
figure skating freestyle competitions at its world championships.

Types of skaters 
Ice / Inliners
Ice figure skaters who train off-ice on inline figure skates.
Quad / Inliners
Artistic roller skaters who also skate on inline figure skates.

Organizations

 International Roller Sports Federation
 Off-Ice Skating
 World Inline Figure Skating Association World Inline Figure Skating Association - WIFSA
The World Inline Figure Skating Association was established in Paris January 30, 2011. The President is Fernand Fedronic.

The 8th inline skating Worlds was held in Cork July 5–8, 2018. Teams from France, Spain, Italy, Russia, Romania, Ukraine, United States, Ireland and others competed.

The 9th inline skating Worlds was in Fasano, Italy, July 2019.

The 10th inline skating Worlds will be held in Brwinow, Poland on July 5–8, 2020.

References 

Inline skating
Roller skating
Figure skating
Artistic roller skating